MFC PZMS Poltava  (ukr. Міні-Футбольний Клуб «ПЗМС» Полтава), is a futsal club from Poltava, Ukraine, and plays in Ukrainian Women's Futsal Championship.

The club is one of the most titled clubs in Ukraine.

Founded in the 1995 as "Nika Poltava" (later "Nika-Universytet Poltava", "Nika-Peduniversytet Poltava", "Nika-PNPU Poltava"). The current name is in honor of the sponsor (PMGF - Poltava Medical Glass Factory, ukr. ПЗМС - Полтавський завод медичного скла).

Honours
 Ukrainian Women's Futsal Championship:
 1995, 1997, 1997-98, 1998-99, 1999—2000, 2000-01, 2001-02, 2002-03, 2004-05, 2006-07
 Ukrainian Women's Futsal Cup:
 1996, 2000, 2001, 2003, 2005

References

External links 
  Footballfacts profile

Women's futsal clubs in Ukraine
Sport in Poltava
Futsal clubs established in 1995
1995 establishments in Ukraine